Kassav'  is a French Caribbean band formed in Guadeloupe in 1979. The core members of the band are Jacob Desvarieux, Jocelyne Béroard, Jean-Philippe Marthély, Patrick St. Eloi, Jean-Claude Naimro, Claude Vamur, and Georges Décimus (who left to form Volt Face and returned). Kassav' have issued over 20 albums, with a further 12 solo albums by band members.

The music of Kassav' is an extension of cadence-lypso or compas  bands, such as Grammacks, Exile One, Les Aiglons and Experience 7 of the 1970s.

History
Kassav' was formed in 1979 by Pierre-Edouard Décimus (former musicians from the Les Vikings de Guadeloupe) and Paris studio musician Jacob Desvarieux. Together and under the influence of well-known Dominican, Haitian and Guadeloupean kadans or compas bands like Experience 7, Grammacks, Exile One,  Les Aiglons, Tabou Combo, Les Freres Dejean, etc., they decided to make Guadeloupean carnival music recording it in a more fully orchestrated yet modern and polished style. The name of the band is Antillean Creole for a local dish made from cassava root.

Kassav' is the creator of the fast carnival zouk Beton style. The French Antilles' Kassav' was the first to apply the MIDI technology to cadence and fused the genre with funk, and Makossa.

Music of Guadeloupe and Martinique:

 The gwo ka, traditional music of Guadeloupe, of which there are 7 versions (rhythmic)
 The bélé, traditional music from Martinique, of which there are 11 variants (rhythmic)
 The biguine music of Martinique
 The chouval bwa, traditional music of Martinique associated with the city of Saint-Pierre
 The mazurka and quadrille, European music of the French Antilles
 The Compas, modern Haitian méringue popularized by Nemours Jean-Baptiste in 1955
 The cadence rampa (kadans), alike compas, a modern Haitian méringue popularized by Webert Sicot in the very early 60s that spread to the Caribbean
 The cadence-lypso of Dominica cadence popularized by Exile One with Gordon Henderson and also interpreted by groups such as Grammacks with Jeff Joseph as a senior member. Experience 7 was a Guadeloupean cadence band formed in the mid-1970s, led by Guy Houllier and Yves Honore.

Most authors credit Décimus, his brother Georges, the band's bassist and Desvarieux as its inventors. Their first album was Love and Ka Dance (1980). The band gained popularity in their much-heralded live performances in Paris's Club Zenith and toured widely. For a band ostensibly operating in a "narrowly focused" Caribbean dance-based new genre, their success and influence on other artists was remarkable, although they were most influenced by a veritable cornucopia of other styles as noted above.

Kassav' continued to gain popularity both as a group and by several members' solo recordings, eventually peaking in 1985 with Yélélé, which featured the international hit "Zouk la sé sèl médikaman nou ni" (meaning "Zouk is the only medicine we have" in French Antillean Creole). With this hit song, zouk rapidly became a widespread dance craze in Latin America and the Caribbean, and was popular in Europe, Africa, and Asia. Zouk performers became known for wildly theatrical concerts featuring special effects, stage spectacles and colorful costumes. One important contribution of Kassav' in concert was the appearance of featured dancers on stage with the band; these dancers were in many ways as much a part of the band as any musician. Kassav' has been noted by its acolytes and aficionados as a dance band par excellence.

Among the strengths of Kassav' that helped lead to the group's success were and are its members' superior musicianship, songwriting and production skills, and worldwide audiences eager for lively dance music more sophisticated than the disco/techno-based styles that otherwise dominated dance music charts in that era. The especially gravelly singing voice of Desvarieux, Décimus's driving bass, Naimro's and Joseph's inventive keyboards and superior drum-machine-based and Vamur's solid jazz-inflected live percussion, along with dance party-inspiring simple French-creole lyrics are among unique Kassav' "trademarks". During his tenure with Kassav', St. Eloi's soaring vocals were another unique ingredient, and the romantic vocals of Marthely and Naimro's as well as Béroard's very strong vocals, a plethora of fun songs, and significant guest appearances including by Stevie Wonder and others are important parts of the Kassav' mix.

They have appeared with Admiral T, a famous reggae dancehall singer, and many other popular artists. Singer-songwriter/keyboardist Jean-Claude Naimro also appeared with world beat artist Peter Gabriel. Lead vocalist Jocelyne Béroard has also had a number of successes both solo and as a guest with other artists, being the first woman artist in the Caribbean to win certain music awards; she continues to perform with Kassav' and as a solo artist.

Jocelyne Béroard's stunning "amateur" photography of natural scenes and people seen from her unique traveling-artist perspective's island-paradise visuals could be cited among their songs' inspirations. The band's songs with a "political" edge or insinuation are typically double-entendre in the African-American and calypsonian traditions well known in Caribbean dance music from which the music of Kassav' evolved.

Kassav' released another CD in 2007, All U Need Is Zouk, to substantial acclaim with another successful world tour. Nearly 30 years later the same musicians are still arguably great performers .

Originally formed solely of Guadeloupean artists (Decimus, Desvarieux, St-Eloi), within a few years Kassav' also embraced band members of Martinican ancestry (Béroard, Naimro, Marthely); their music is mostly compas that delved deep into synthesized sounds after exploring many acoustic timbres, with rhythms based fundamentally in a gwo ka (French Caribbean folkloric drumming/chanting) context, especially in earlier recordings. It has been suggested that their success was largely outside of the large U.S. music market due to a nearly total absence of English lyrics; instead, they use a very localized version of Créole Français unique to Guadeloupe and Martinique, very distinct from European French or even Haitian French Kreyòl. Their choice of language however did not limit their artistic vision, and it remains carnival-like and eminently danceable; the success of Kassav' was ongoing in the 2010s.

On 30 July 2021, Jacob Desvarieux, 65, passed away at the University Hospital of Abymes in Guadeloupe. He had been medically induced into a coma for almost a month. His death was attributed to COVID-19 by media reports.

Musicians

Current
 Vocals: Jean Philippe Marthely (1981–present), Jocelyne Beroard (1980–present)
 Keyboards: Philippe Joseph (1994–present), Jean Claude Naimro (1980–present)
 Drums: Thomas Bellon (2012–present)
 Saxophones: Claude Pironneau (1999–present)
 Bass:      Georges Decimus (1979–present)
 Trumpets:
Fabrice Adam (1994–present) 
 Trombone: Hamid Belhocine (1982–present)
 Backing vocals: Marie-Céline Chroné et Marie-Josée Gibon

Past
 Drums: Claude Vamur (temporarily replaced by Hervé Laval, although Vamur did not leave the group)
 Percussion: Patrick Saint-Elie
 Percussion: César Durcin (died 11 February 2016) 
 Saxophones: Claude Thirifays
 Trumpets: Jean-Pierre Ramirez, Freddy Hovsepian (1982–2021) (died 12 February 2021) 
 Trombone: Claude Romano
 Backing vocals: Catherine Laupa
 Keyboards: Douglas M Bida
 Bass: Frédéric Caracas, Pierre Edouard Decimus, Guy n Sangué et Stéphane Castry
 Vocals: Patrick Saint Eloi 1982 - 2002 (died 18 September 2010)
 Vocals: Jacob Desvarieux 1979 – 2021 (died 30 July 2021)

Guests
 Vocals: Zouk Machine, Jean Luc Guanel, Princess Lover, Tanya Saint Val, Shoubou, Philippe Lavil, Daly, Passi, Tony Chasseur, Jocelyne Labylle, Tribal Jam, Edith Lefel, (died 20 January 2003), Ralph Thamar.
 Backing Vocals: Claudine Pennont, Suzy Trébeau, Sylvie Aïoun, Jean-Jacques Seba
 Drums: Jean-Philippe Fanfant, José Zébina, Jérome Castry
 Percussion: Dédé Saint Prix, Albert Vigne
 Keyboards: Ronald Tulle, Thierry Vaton, Didier Davidas
 Guitars: Thierry Delannay, Ryco Loza (died 24 February 2022), Jean Christophe Maillard
 Saxophones: Allen Hoist, Alain Hatot  (died 16 December 2020), Bruno Ribeira

Discography

Albums
Studio albums
 1979 Love and kadance
 1980 Lagué mwen
 1981 Kassav n°3
 1982 George Décimus with Kassav''' (joint album George Décimus / Kassav')
 1983 Kassav 1983 Kassav n°5 1983 Passeport 1984 Ayé 1985 An-ba-chen'n la (2× Gold)
 1987 Vini Pou (Gold and Platinum)
 1989 Majestik Zouk (2× Gold)
 1992 Tékit izi (2× Gold)
 1995 DiféLive albums
 1987 Kassav au Zenith 1990 Le Grand Méchant Zouk 1993 Live au Zénith 1996 Kassav cho 2005 Carnaval Tour 2005 (FR #124)
 2006 Le Grand Méchant ZoukCompilation albums
 1987 Les Grand Succès de Kassav vol.1 1987 Les Grand Succès de Kassav vol.2 1998 Kassav Gold 1998 Un toque latino 1999 Le Meilleur de Kassav : Best of 20e anniversaire 2002 Les Indispensables de Kassav 2003 Légendes Kassav 2006 Best of 2006 Kassav: Les années sonodisc 2009 Saga (3 CD with 53 remastered numbers and 4 unedited) (FR #45)
 2012 Le meilleur de Kassav' (FR #20)

Singles
(Selective, charting)

DVDs
 1999 Les 20 ans de KASSAV à Bercy 2005 Carnaval tour 2006 Le grand méchant zouk 2008 All u need is zouk tour 2009 Nuit créole les 30 ans de KASSAV au Stade de FranceDiscography (members)

Joint with others
 2006 Partie pour zouker (Lorie & Jacob Desvarieux)
 2007 Fòs a péyi la'' (Admiral T, Jacob Desvarieux & Jocelyne Beroard)

References

External links
Official website
 
 

Zouk musicians
Musical groups established in 1979
1979 establishments in Guadeloupe
Guadeloupean musical groups
Recipients of orders, decorations, and medals of Senegal